The 27th Writers Guild of America Awards honored the best film writers and television writers of 1974. Winners were announced in 1975.

Winners & Nominees

Film 
Winners are listed first highlighted in boldface.

Television

Special Awards

References

External links 

 WGA.org

1974
W
Writers Guild of America Awards
Writers Guild of America Awards
Writers Guild of America Awards